Discoderus is a genus of beetles in the family Carabidae, containing the following species:

 Discoderus acinopoides Bates, 1884 
 Discoderus aequalis Casey, 1914 
 Discoderus amoenus Leconte, 1863 
 Discoderus arcuatus Putzeys, 1878 
 Discoderus congruens Casey, 1914 
 Discoderus cordicollis G.Horn, 1891 
 Discoderus crassicollis G.Horn, 1891 
 Discoderus crassiusculus Putzeys, 1878 
 Discoderus dallasensis Casey, 1924 
 Discoderus difformipes Bates, 1882 
 Discoderus dislocatus Bates, 1891 
 Discoderus distortus Bates, 1882 
 Discoderus impotens Leconte, 1858 
 Discoderus longicollis Casey, 1914 
 Discoderus melanthus Bates, 1884 
 Discoderus obsidianus Casey, 1914 
 Discoderus papagonis Casey, 1914 
 Discoderus parallelus Haldeman, 1843 
 Discoderus parilis Casey, 1914 
 Discoderus peregrinus Casey, 1924 
 Discoderus piger Bates, 1882 
 Discoderus pinguis Casey, 1884 
 Discoderus pulvinatus Bates, 1884 
 Discoderus robustus G.Horn, 1883 
 Discoderus subviolaceus Casey, 1914 
 Discoderus symbolicus Casey, 1914 
 Discoderus tenebrosus Leconte, 1848 
 Discoderus texanus Casey, 1924

References

Harpalinae